Persatuan Sepakbola Kota Bukittinggi (also known as PSKB Bukittinggi) is an Indonesian football club based in Bukittinggi, West Sumatra. They currently compete in the Liga 3.

Honours
 Liga 3 West Sumatra
 Champion: 2021

References

External links

Football clubs in Indonesia
Football clubs in West Sumatra